Saadia Zahidi is a managing director at the World Economic Forum.

Education 
Zahidi holds a bachelor's degree in economics from Smith College, a master's in international economics from Graduate Institute Geneva, and an MPA from Harvard University.

Career 
Zahidi started her career at the World Economic Forum as an economist in 2004. She was the youngest person to be appointed managing director and board member at the World Economic Forum in 2018.

She heads the Forum's Centre for the New Economy and Society responsible for economy, human capital, development and equity agendas at the Forum. She co-authors the Forum's Future of Jobs, Global Gender Gap and Global Risks Reports. She also leads initiatives on growth, innovation, skills, jobs, equity and social mobility.

She served on the UN Secretary General's high level panel on women's economic empowerment and on the European Space Agency's high level advisory group on human and robotic space exploration. 

She published the book Fifty Million Rising: The New Generation of Working Women Transforming the Muslim World in 2018.

Awards 
Her book Fifty Million Rising was longlisted for the 2018 Financial Times and McKinsey Business Book of the Year Award. Her book proposal won the inaugural Financial Times and McKinsey Bracken Bower Prize for young business authors in 2014. 

She was honoured in BBC's 100 Women in 2013 and 2014.

Personal Life 
Zahidi was born and raised in Pakistan and is a citizen of Pakistan and Switzerland.  She speaks four languages.

References 

Year of birth missing (living people)
Living people
British women economists
Harvard Kennedy School alumni
Smith College alumni
English economists
21st-century English people
Pakistani expatriates in England
BBC 100 Women